Thomas Gustav Borer (born 29 July 1957 in Basel ; legal domicile in Büsserach ) is a Swiss management consultant, lobbyist and former diplomat. From 1996 to 1999 he headed the Switzerland – Second World War Task Force. He then was Switzerland's ambassador to Germany until 2002.

Career 
Thomas Borer studied law at the University of Basel where he obtained his doctorate summa cum laude in 1985. His thesis focused  on the principle of legality and foreign affairs. He then worked at Credit Swiss in Geneva.

Activity as a Diplomat 
In 1987, Borer joined the Federal Department of Foreign Affairs (FDFA) as a diplomat. He was posted to Bern (Department for International Law, 1987 and 1989–93), Lagos (1987/88) and Geneva (1988/89). In 1993, he was appointed Embassy Secretary for Legal and Political Affairs at the Swiss Embassy in Washington, USA. In 1993, Borer played a decisive role in shaping the future strategy of Swiss neutrality policy, which is still in force today. He wrote the report on neutrality. On 21 December 1994, he was appointed Deputy General Secretary of the EDA by the Swiss Federal Council. In this role, he led the personnel, technology, logistics, finance and administrative law departments. In addition, he was responsible for the reorganisation of the EDA and the Swiss Representative Network Abroad.

On 25 October 1996 the Swiss Federal Council appointed him Ambassador and Head of the “Switzerland – Second World War” Task Force, which examined the role of Switzerland as a financial centre during the Nazi era. The Task Force contributed substantially to settle a lawsuit  filed by the Holocaust survivors against Swiss banks in 1995. As a consequence, on 12 August 1998 the Swiss banks UBS and Credit Suisse reached an agreement with the claimants and agreed to pay $1.25 billion to victims of the holocaust or their heirs.  Borer gained international recognition for his commitment in this process. In 2010 he stepped down and since works as a strategic advisor in politics and economy on behalf of companies and individuals.

On 31 March 1999, the Swiss Federal Council named Borer as Swiss Ambassador to the Federal Republic of Germany. At the end of April 2002, he left public service and returned to Switzerland. Shortly after he became strategic consultant for Russian oligarch Viktor Vekselberg, and in 2005 a member of the Board of Directors of Renova Group, Viktor Vekselberg's company. He stepped down in 2010 and has since been working as a strategic advisor for different private and public companies.

In the German and international news media, Borer is a popular speaker and commentator on economic issues and on Swiss-German relations, particularly on Switzerland as a financial center and on the banking secrecy.

Consultancy 
After retiring from diplomacy, Thomas Borer became a management consultant in 2002. Since then he has been active in the strategic representation of interests in politics, business, society and the media. He performs various mandates for companies and individuals.

From 2010 to 2015 Borer was president and chief executive officer of Swiss Authentication Research and Development AG , which develops chemical and physical security solutions to protect against counterfeit products.  He was also a member of the advisory board of Corestate Capital Holding SA between 2010 and 2017.  Borer currently also holds various board memberships. Since 2017 he has been Chairman of the supervisory board of Capita Customer Services (Germany) GmbH , since 2018 Chairman of the Board of Directors of Global Bridge Strategies AG, a legal consultancy based in Zurich, and since 2019 also chairman of the Board of Directors of BRR Investment AG. He has also been a member of the board of directors at Hendricks & Schwartz (Switzerland) AG since 2006. Borer has been on the advisory board of Oriflame Cosmetics AG since 2010 and on the advisory board of the Swiss language technology provider Spitch.

In January 2015 it was announced that Borer would support the Kazakh government interests in Switzerland from spring 2014 for a fee of 30,000 dollars per month. The focus was on the extradition of Viktor Vyacheslavovich Chrapunov, a Kazakh oligarch and former Kazakh energy minister, who embezzled millions and then applied for asylum in Switzerland.  The Federal Prosecutor's office dismissed an indictment by Chrapunow against Borer .

Borer appears in the media as a speaker and commentator on geopolitical and economic issues, on German-Swiss relations, especially with the Swiss financial center and banking secrecy, as well as international political relations in Europe and North America.

Family 
Borer was married to Shawne Fielding from 1999 to 2014; the couple separated in 2010. Borer is divorced, has three children, two of them with Fielding. He currently lives and works in Thalwil, Switzerland.

Publications 

 Das Legalitätsprinzip und die auswärtigen Angelegenheiten. Helbing und Lichtenhahn. Basel/Frankfurt am Main. 1986.
"Schweizerische Neutralität auf dem Prüfstand – Schweizerische Aussenpolitik zwischen Kontinuität und Wandel". Bern. 1992.
"Switzerland and the European Economic Union". Washington. 1993.
"Die bewaffnete Neutralität der Schweiz". Thun. 1996.
"Struktur und Arbeitsweise des EDA im Wandel". Revue d’Allemagne. 1996.
"The role of Switzerland as financial center during World War II, The United States House of Representatives Committee on Banking and Financial Services". Washington. 1996.
"Switzerland – Second World War, London Conference on Nazi Gold". London. 1997.
"Informationsführung in einer Krisenlage". Aargau. 1998.
"Holocaust Era Assets, Looted Art, the Swiss perspective", Washington Conference on Holocaust Era Assets. J.D. Bindenagel. Washington. 1999.
 Die Auseinandersetzung Schweiz – Zweiter Weltkrieg: Ein neuer Typ politischer Risiken für Unternehmen und die Lehren für die Zukunft? (at the Symposium on Management of political Risks at Financial Institutions, Universität of St. Gallen). Maerki Baumann. Zürich. 2001.
"Symposium zum Management politischer Risiken in Finanzinstitutionen". Universität St. Gallen. 2001.
"Das Erscheinungsbild der Schweiz im Ausland und die „öffentliche Diplomatie"". Coutts Zürich. 2002.
"Die Uhren gehen anders – Gedanken zu Kommunikation und Zusammenarbeit zwischen Wirtschaft und Politik, 19. Deutscher Logistik-Kongress". Berlin. 2002.
"Grenzüberschreitendes Finanzdienstleistungsgeschäft: Schweizer Finanzdienstleistungen auf dem deutschen und europäischen Markt". Friends of Funds. Zürich. 2003.
"Public Affairs". Econ Verlag. München. 2003.
"Why we Swiss are ‘staying out’". Financial Times. 2004.
"Russland ist anders, als man es zu kennen glaubt. Ein Plädoyer für den fairen Umgang". Weltwoche. 9 July 2008 
"Ein Land mit dem Gesicht nach Westen: Warum Russland für Schweizer Investoren spannend bleibt". Handelszeitung. 17 June 2009. 
"Die Konkordanz fördert Durchschnittliche". Neue Zürcher Zeitung. 12 Januar 2012.

References

Further reading 

 Oliver Zihlmann, Philippe Pfister: Der Fall Borer. Fakten und Hintergründe eines Medienskandals. Werd Verlag. Zürich. 2003.

1957 births
Living people
University of Basel alumni
Swiss diplomats
Ambassadors of Switzerland to Germany